Annual or Anoual (Berber language: Anwal) is a small town in northeastern Morocco about 60 km west of Nador. There, during the Rif War or War of Melilla, on July 22, 1921, the Spanish army suffered a grave military defeat against the Rifian Berber army, known as the Battle of Annual.

Populated places in Driouch Province
Colonial history of Morocco
1921 in Morocco